Estraden, stylized as estraden, is a Swedish pop group consisting of Carl Silvergran, Felix Flygare Floderer and Lou Elliotte. The group was formed in 2017 and releases its music through Sony Music. Until June 2019 the group's name was Estrad but due to a naming dispute, it had to change its name. The group's single "Mer för varandra", featuring Norlie & KKV, peaked at number one on the Swedish Singles Chart. In 2020, they released the singles "Det svåraste", "Dansar med mig själv" and "Aldrig mer vara du". The singles charted in the top 30 on the Swedish Singles Chart. The group released its debut studio album during the same year, entitled Mellan hägg och syrén. It debuted at number 13 on the Swedish Albums Chart.

Discography

Albums

Singles

As lead artist

Other charted songs

As featured group

Other appearances

Notes

References

External links
 Official Facebook page

Musical groups established in 2017
Swedish-language singers
Swedish pop music groups
2017 establishments in Sweden